The Night Riders is a 1939 American "Three Mesquiteers" Western film starring John Wayne, Ray "Crash" Corrigan, and Max Terhune. Wayne played the lead in eight of the fifty-one Three Mesquiteer films. The director was George Sherman. The villain of the film was based on a real-life character in the Old West, James Reavis, who was also known as The Baron of Arizona.

Plot summary

Cast
 John Wayne as Stony Brooke
 Ray Corrigan as Tucson Smith
 Max Terhune as Lullaby Joslin
 Elmer as Elmer (Lullaby Joslin's Ventriloquist Dummy) (uncredited) 
 Doreen McKay as Soledad
 Ruth Rogers as Susan Randall
 George Douglas as Talbot Pierce, aka Don Luis de Serrano
 Tom Tyler as Henchman Jackson
 Kermit Maynard as Sheriff Pratt
 Sammy McKim as Tim Randall
 Walter Wills as Hazleton (the Forger)
 Ethan Laidlaw as Henchman Andrews
 Edward Peil Sr. as Rancher
 Tom London as Rancher
 Jack Ingram as Henchman Wilkins
 Bill Nestell as Brawler
 Hank Worden as Rancher (uncredited)
 Horace Murphy as Riverboat Captain Asa Beckett (uncredited)  
 Yakima Canutt as Mob Member at Gate (uncredited) 
 Bob Card as Rancher (uncredited) 
 Allan Cavan as Judge (uncredited)
 Dick Dickinson as Henchman Rent Collector (uncredited

See also
 John Wayne filmography

References

External links
 
 
 
 

1939 films
1939 Western (genre) films
American Western (genre) films
American black-and-white films
1930s English-language films
Films directed by George Sherman
Films scored by William Lava
Cultural depictions of James A. Garfield
Republic Pictures films
Three Mesquiteers films
1930s American films